Miss Universe 1986, the 35th Miss Universe pageant, was held on 21 July 1986 at the Atlapa Convention Centre in Panama City, Panama. Bárbara Palacios Teyde of Venezuela was crowned by Deborah Carthy-Deu of Puerto Rico. Seventy-seven contestants competed in this year.

Results

Placements

Final competition

Contestants

  - María de los Ángeles Fernández Espadero
  - Mildred Jacqueline Semeleer
  - Christina Lucinda Bucat
  - Manuela Redtenbacher
  - Marie Brown
  - Roslyn Irene Williams
  - Goedele Maria Liekens
  - Romy Ellen Taegar
  - Elizabeth O'Connor-d'Arlach
  - Deise Nunes 
  - Shereen Desmona Flax
  - Renee Newhouse
  - Mariana Villasante Aravena
  - María Mónica Urbina Pugliesse
  - Lorna Sawtell
  - Aurora Velásquez Arigño
  - Marie Françoise Kouame
  - Christine Joyce Denise Sibilo
  - Christina Vassaliadou
  - Helena Christensen
  - Lissette Chamorro
  - Verónica Lucía Sevilla Ledergerber
  - Vicky Elizabeth Cañas Álvarez
  - Joanne Ruth Sedgley
  - Tuula Irmeli Polvi
  - Catherine Carew
  - Rose Marie Eunson
  - Birgit Jahn
  - Gail Anne May Francis
  - Vasilia Mantaki
  - Dina Ann Reyes Salas
  - Christa Kalula Wellman Girón
   - Caroline Veldkamp †
  - Sandra Natalie Navarrete Romero
 - San Lee Robin Mae
  - Thora Thrastardóttir
  - Mehr Jesia
  - Karen Ann Shevlin
  - Nilly Drucker †
  - Susanna Huckstep
  - Liliana Antoinette Cisneros
  - Hiroko Esaki
  - Young-ran Bae
  - Reine Philip Barakat
  - Martine Christine Georgette Pilot
  - Betty Chee Nyuk Pit
  - Antoinette Zerafa
  - Alejandrina "Connie" Carranza Ancheta
  - Christine Atkinson
  - Christine Guerrero
  - Tone Anette Henriksen
  - Gilda García López
  - Anna Wild
  - Johanna Eugenia Kelner Toja 
  - Karin Mercedes Lindemann García
  - Violeta Naluz
  - Brygida Elzbieta Bziukiewicz
  - Mariana Dias Carriço
  - Elizabeth Robison Latalladi
  - Geneviève Lebon
  - Natalie M. Devlin
  - Farah Lange
  - Concepción "Concha" Isabel Tur Espinosa
  - Indra Kumari
  - Anne Lena Rahmberg
  - Eveline Nicole Glanzmann
  - Thaveeporn Klungpoy
  - Candace Jennings
  - Demet Başdemir
  - Barbara Bulah Mae Capron
  - Norma Silvana García Lapitz
  - Christy Fichtner
  - Jasmine Olivia Turner
  - Bárbara Palacios Teyde
  - Tracey Rowlands
   - Tui Kaye Hunt
  - Aimee Likobe Dobala

Notes

Debut

Withdrawals
  - Samantha Jayne Morton
 
 
 
 
  ー participated only in Miss France since then
  - Tatjana Spasic

Returns
Last competed in 1975:
 
Last competed in 1984:

Awards
  - Miss Amity (Dina Reyes Salas)
  - Miss Photogenic (Susanna Huckstep)
  - Best National Costume (Gilda García López)

Celebrity judges 
 Harry Langdon (actor) - actor
 Shawn Weatherly - Miss Universe 1980 from United States
 Kristy McNichol - actress
 Patrick Macnee - actor
 Willard Pugh - actor
 Sandy Duncan - actress

General references

References

External links
 Miss Universe official website

1986
1986 beauty pageants
1986 in Panama
Beauty pageants in Panama
Events in Panama City
July 1986 events